Fabius Maximus Stanly (December 15, 1815 – December 5, 1882) was a rear admiral of the United States Navy, who served during the Mexican–American War and the American Civil War.

Early life

Fabius Maximus Stanly was born on December 15, 1815, in New Bern, North Carolina to John Stanly. His father was the speaker of the North Carolina House of Commons and U.S. Representative from North Carolina. His grandfather was John Wright Stanly, a veteran of the American Revolutionary War.

Career
Stanly was appointed midshipman on December 20, 1831. He sailed on the frigate USS Constellation from 1832 to 1834. He then served in a variety of places, including Hudson, Concord, Warren, Consort, Falmouth, the Pacific Ocean, Delaware and Brazil until 1843. He was promoted to lieutenant on September 8, 1841. He commanded the sloop USS Warren in 1854. He was the executive officer of the Mare Island Navy Yard in 1855.

During the Mexican–American War, Stanly was assigned to the Pacific Squadron and participated in the capture of California and the defense of San Francisco. He also took part in several land raids and, during the Capture of Guaymas, led a party of 30 sailors on a cannon-spiking raid in the midst of 1,500 enemy troops. He completed his mission successfully, returning to the boats with all his wounded and some prisoners to boot. He also participated in the Capture of Mazatlán and received a knife wound to the chest.

After the Mexican–American War, Stanly commanded steamers of the Pacific Mail Steamship Company from 1850 to 1851, and during the Paraguay expedition commanded the store ship Supply. From 1859 to 1860, Stanly was on the steamer USS Wyandotte. On May 9, 1860, Wyandotte captured the slave ship William off the coast of Cuba. After his service with the Wyandotte, Stanly was sent to California to command the receiving ship USS Independence.

After the start of the American Civil War, Stanly was commissioned as commander on May 19, 1861, and served on the steamer Narragansett. He served as a diplomat with Mexico. At that time, he was given command of the side-wheel steamer  and cruised off the coast of South Carolina, including participating in the expedition of Bull's Run. Stanly served in the Pacific Squadron until 1864.

Stanly was commissioned captain on July 25, 1866, commodore on July 1, 1870, and rear admiral on February 12, 1874. He retired from the Navy on June 4, 1874.

Personal life
His sister married General Walker Keith Armistead. His brother, Edward Stanly, served as the North Carolina Attorney General and as speaker in the North Carolina House of Commons.

Stanly died in Washington, D.C., on December 5, 1882. He was buried at Oak Hill Cemetery in Washington, D.C.

Legacy
In 1941, the destroyer  was named in his honor.

References

External links

 

1815 births
1882 deaths
People from New Bern, North Carolina
United States Navy admirals
United States Navy personnel of the Mexican–American War
People of North Carolina in the American Civil War
Burials at Oak Hill Cemetery (Washington, D.C.)